The Alasay District (Alah Say) is situated in the eastern part of Kapisa Province, Afghanistan. It borders Tagab District (Kapisa Province) to the south and east, Nejrab District to the north and Laghman Province to the east. The population is 38,642 (2015). The district center is Alasay, located in its southwestern part.

Security and operations
From approximately 2006 until March 2009 the area was considered insurgent controlled. In March, however, French forces from GTIA Kapisa and Chasseurs Alpins 27e Battalion, along with a battalion of Afghan troops were able to successfully drive them out and establish two Afghan National Army bases in the valley.

Geography
Most of the Alasay district is mountainous, and many of its villages are inaccessible by vehicles. The Alasay District contains three large valleys:
 Shibi dara (most populated)
 Masken data
 Alasay dara

There are approximately 70 villages in the district.

Education
Alasay currently has 13 schools:
 8 primary schools (7091 students, male and female)
 2 high schools (294 students, male only)
 1 madrassa (unknown number of students, male only)

Currently, the high schools and Madrassa in the district are boys' schools.

Economy
The Alasay district is poor, with only a small amount of land usable for agriculture. Other sources of income include animal husbandry and labor.

Health care
Currently, the Alasay district only contains four health facilities, located in the villages of Alasay, Ashpai, Koti, and Eskin.

References

External links 
 District Profile
 AIMS District Map

Districts of Kapisa Province